The 2020 Gilgit-Baltistan Assembly elections were held on 15 November 2020. Elections will be held in 24 constituencies, each electing one member to the 3rd Gilgit-Baltistan Legislative Assembly. 330 candidates will contest these elections, either representing one of the political parties of Gilgit-Baltistan (at the time of the 2020 elections) or being an independent candidate.

The elections were originally scheduled to be held on 18 August 2020, but were postponed in July due to the COVID-19 pandemic, which severely affected Gilgit-Baltistan.

The Pakistan Army was not be called in to preside over the polls at the Election, with Mir Afzal, the Caretaker Chief Minister of Gilgit-Baltistan, giving a statement that the caretaker government had the capacity to hold free, fair, and transparent elections in Gilgit-Baltistan.

Opinion polling taken before the election had shown the Pakistan Muslim League (Nawaz), the ruling party prior to the 2020 election, being the third-most-popular political party in Gilgit-Baltistan, falling from its earlier position of making the province's government and having the largest vote-bank. The Pakistan Tehreek-e-Insaf, which rules nationally, led in the polls and the Pakistan Peoples Party has been shown as the second-most-popular political party.

745,362 voters in Gilgit-Baltistan had the ability to exercise their right to vote in the elections and will be able to vote across nearly 1,234 polling places across the province. This showed an increase of 126,998 new voters since 2015, when only 618,364 people were registered to vote. 405,365 of the people registered to vote are male and 339,997 are female (which shows a gender gap of 9%).

The elections were be postponed in the constituency GBA-3 (Gilgit-III), due to the PTI candidate in that constituency, who was the provincial party leader, dying of COVID-19 in early October. The election there were held on November 22, seven days after the election throughout the rest of Gilgit-Baltistan.

Preliminary and unofficial results have shown the Pakistan Tehreek-e-Insaf being all set to form the next government in Gilgit-Baltistan. They have won eleven general seats, Independent politicians have won seven seats, the Pakistan Peoples Party has won three seats, the Pakistan Muslim League (Nawaz) has won two seats, and the Majlis Wahdat-e-Muslimeen has won one seat.

Background

2015 elections 

Following the elections in 2015, Pakistan Muslim League (N), emerged as the largest party winning 15 of the 24 general seats in the Gilgit-Baltistan Assembly, and securing a supermajority in the assembly after the three technocrat (two who went to PML(N)) and six women representatives (four who went to PML(N)) were added with a final total of 21 out of 33 seats. Hafiz Hafeezur Rehman was elected as the Chief Minister of Gilgit-Baltistan.

Timeline 

April 30, 2020: The Supreme Court of Pakistan allows the federal government to form a caretaker government in late June 2020 and hold a general election in Gilgit-Baltistan less than sixty days after the formation of the caretaker government.
June 24, 2020: The members of the second assembly of Gilgit-Baltistan complete their full five-year terms and the assembly is dissolved. Mir Afzal is sworn in as the Chief Minister of Gilgit-Baltistan, serving as a caretaker.
June 27, 2020: The President of Pakistan, Dr. Arif Alvi releases a statement scheduling the date August 18, 2020 to be the date of polling in the 2020 Gilgit-Baltistan Assembly election.
July 2, 2020: An election schedule is issued by the Gilgit-Baltistan Election Commission confirming August 18, 2020 to be the date of polling.
July 11, 2020: The Gilgit-Baltistan Election Commission postpones the upcoming election and suspends the previously published schedule in light of the COVID-19 pandemic. New dates of polling in October 2020 are deliberated upon.
September 23, 2020: The President of Pakistan, Dr. Arif Alvi gives approval to the proposed polling date of November 15, 2020 for the 2020 Gilgit-Baltistan Assembly election.
September 24, 2020: A detailed election schedule is issued by the Gilgit-Baltistan Election Commission confirming the new date of polling, November 15, 2020.
October 3, 2020: The Caretaker Chief Minister of Gilgit-Baltistan Mir Afzal states that the Pakistan military's help will not be required in holding free and fair elections throughout Gilgit-Baltistan.
October 19, 2020: The final revised list of the candidates running in each constituency is published by the Election Commission of Gilgit-Baltistan.
October 20, 2020: Election Symbols are allotted to political parties and candidates.
November 13, 2020: Official electoral rolls and lists of polling stations are released.
November 15, 2020: Elections held in all general seats of Gilgit-Baltistan except GBA-3 (Gilgit-III).
November 22, 2020: Election held in GBA-3 (Gilgit-III).

Parties 

The table below lists the ten political parties that fielded at least three candidates (out of a possible 24 constituencies) or won at least one assembly seat in the 2020 Gilgit-Baltistan Assembly election, and gives a detailed overview of their characteristics. Parties are initially ordered by their voteshare in the 2015 Gilgit-Baltistan Assembly Election.

Opinion Polls 
 
In the run up to the 2020 Gilgit-Baltistan elections, various organisations have carried out opinion polling to gauge voting intention throughout Gilgit-Baltistan. The results of such polls are displayed in this section. The date range for these opinion polls are from the previous general election, held on 8 June 2015, to the present day.

Voting Intention 
 
The table below shows the results of polls taken which asked the people of Gilgit-Baltistan which political party they would vote for in the 2020 election.

Results 

The two tables below show the results of the 2020 Gilgit-Baltistan Assembly Election by Political Party. The first table shows the results for the elections provincewide, through all 24 constituencies, and shows each political party's standing. The second table shows more detailed results for each of the 24 general constituencies.

Currently, only unofficial provisional results that are being reported by various news sources are shown in the tables below, but in the future the final results will be uploaded onto the Gilgit-Baltistan Election Commission Official website.

PTI got 2/3rd majority in the Gilgit-Baltistan Assembly after getting 4 out of 6 reserved seats for women and 2 out of 3 reserved seats for technocrats. PPP got one women seat and one technocrat seat whereas PMLN only got one reserved seat for women. PTI became the first party in Gilgit Baltistan History to get 2/3rd Majority.

Provincewide

By Constituency

Notes

References 

Elections in Gilgit-Baltistan
2020 elections in Pakistan
2020 in Pakistani politics